Rhinocochlis nasuta is a species of air-breathing land snails, terrestrial pulmonate gastropod mollusks in the family Dyakiidae.

Rhinocochlis nasuta is the only species in the genus Rhinocochlis.

References

 
 
 

Dyakiidae
Gastropods described in 1851